Nassodonta annesleyi is a species of brackish water snail, with gills and an operculum, a gastropod mollusk in the family Nassariidae.

The specific name annesleyi is in honour of Lieutenant-Colonel Charles Annesley Benson (1831–1906) of the 45th Regiment of Madras Native Infantry, who collected those snails.

Distribution
India.

References 

Nassariidae
Gastropods described in 1861